St. Jago Prep School is an Anglican primary level co-educational school in Saint Catherine Parish, Jamaica.

Principals

Schools in Jamaica
Buildings and structures in Saint Catherine Parish
Spanish Town